"The Sopranos", also known as "Pilot", is the first episode of the HBO television drama series, The Sopranos, which premiered on January 10, 1999. It was written and directed by the series creator and executive producer David Chase.

Cast

Starring
 James Gandolfini as Tony Soprano
 Lorraine Bracco as Dr. Jennifer Melfi
 Edie Falco as Carmela Soprano
 Michael Imperioli as Christopher Moltisanti
 Dominic Chianese as Corrado Soprano, Jr.
 Vincent Pastore as Pussy Bonpensiero
 Steven Van Zandt as Silvio Dante
 Tony Sirico as Paulie Gualtieri
 Robert Iler as Anthony Soprano, Jr.
 Jamie-Lynn Sigler as Meadow Soprano
 Nancy Marchand as Livia Soprano

Synopsis 
New Jersey Summer 1998. New Jersey mobster Tony Soprano, a capo in the DiMeo crime family, has been referred to a psychiatrist, Dr. Jennifer Melfi, after having a panic attack. Tony tells her he is a waste management consultant, but she knows who he is. After Melfi establishes what will and will not fall under doctor-patient confidentiality, Tony begins to partly open up.

He has recently been dealing with tensions between his wife Carmela and teenage daughter Meadow, as well as trying to keep Christopher Moltisanti, whom he calls his nephew, in check. Tony's uncle, known as Uncle Junior, resents Tony's rise in the crime family and his own decline. Tony also has a strained relationship with his widowed mother Livia, who is resisting his advice to move into a retirement home. A confrontation with his mother triggers another panic attack, and he returns to Melfi. He tells her about a family of ducks that were living in his swimming pool, but left when the ducklings fledged. Guided by Melfi, Tony realizes he is sad to see them go because he dreads losing his own family; to his consternation, this makes him cry.

When a Czech-American criminal organization bids against Tony for a waste management contract, Christopher acts on his own initiative and kills one of the Czechs, Emil Kolar. The Czechs withdraw their bid.

Junior wants to kill turncoat "Little Pussy" Malanga in a restaurant he frequents, owned by Tony's lifelong friend Artie Bucco. Thinking the murder would ruin the restaurant's reputation, Tony asks Junior not to do it there, but he refuses. Tony tries to get Artie to close the restaurant for three weeks by giving him cruise tickets, but his wife Charmaine refuses them. Finally, Tony has his right-hand man Silvio Dante bomb the restaurant; Artie's reputation will not be damaged, and he will be able to claim insurance compensation.

Mahaffey, whom Tony calls a "degenerate gambler", is in debt to Tony and Hesh Rabkin, an old Jewish friend of Tony's father. Tony, driving, runs Mahaffey down, breaking his leg. He then concocts a scheme for Mahaffey's company to make insurance claims payable to non-existent clinics in order to pay off his debts, and he is forced to comply.

At Tony's son's birthday party, Christopher, bitter about not receiving recognition for killing Kolar, tells Tony he is thinking of turning his life story into a Hollywood script, which Tony angrily forbids.

Driving Livia to the party, an embittered Junior says, "Something may have to be done about Tony". Livia silently looks the other way, with a hint of a smile.

Deceased 
 Emil Kolar: Shot in the back of the head by Christopher Moltisanti.

Cultural references
 Voicing his discontent to Dr. Melfi about the current trend of people to publicly discuss their personal problems, Tony mentions the Sally Jessy Raphael Show.
 When disposing of Emil Kolar's body, Christopher says to "Big Pussy," "Louis Brasi sleeps with the fishes." Pussy corrects him, "Luca Brasi." The character Brasi, and the phrase "sleeps with the fishes," are from The Godfather. 
 Angrily speaking to Christopher, Tony mentions Henry Hill whose life story was documented in the true crime book Wiseguy: Life in a Mafia Family and subsequently adapted into the film Goodfellas.

Production 

Pre-production for the pilot commenced in the summer of 1997, a year and a half before the series debuted on TV. The episode was filmed in August 1997 and completed by October 1997. Despite being well received by Chase's closest friends and the cast and crew who watched it, Chase feared the pilot would not be picked up by HBO and, in that case, planned to ask the network for additional money to shoot another 45 minutes and turn it into a feature film. Chase was also pressured by another, completely new development deal offered to him by another network, which he kept postponing until he heard HBO's verdict on The Sopranos. Right before Christmas of 1997, David Chase received a phone call and learned that HBO did like the pilot and ordered a full season, all of which happened about two hours before the deadline for accepting the other network's deal. Chase was relieved as if "let out of jail. It was like a reprieve from the governor." "The Sopranos" is the first of only two episodes directed by Chase. The other is the series finale, "Made in America". Although this episode is titled "The Sopranos" on the VHS, DVD, Blu-ray, and reruns on A&E, it was referred to as "Pilot" when originally aired.

During the year-long break between the pilot and the start of the shoot of the rest of the 12 episodes of the season, James Gandolfini gained 60 pounds for the role of Tony and underwent voice coaching. Siberia Federico and Michael Santoro play Irina and Father Phil respectively. For future episodes, these roles were recast with Oksana Lada and Paul Schulze. Drea De Matteo was originally simply cast as a restaurant hostess for this one episode only. The filmmakers liked her performance, and her character was developed into the role of Adriana La Cerva in future episodes. The pork store used as a meeting place is Centanni's Meat Market, a real butcher shop in Elizabeth, New Jersey. However, because the shop had a steady business and because local business owners were annoyed with the incidental effects of having a television production being shot on a weekly basis, HBO acquired an abandoned auto parts store in Kearny, New Jersey which became Satriale's Pork Store for use in future episodes.

Awards 
David Chase won the Directors Guild of America Award for Outstanding Directing – Drama Series for his work on this episode and a Primetime Emmy Award for Joanna Cappuccilli for Outstanding Single-Camera Picture Editing for a Drama Series. It was also Emmy-nominated for Outstanding Directing for a Drama Series and Outstanding Writing for a Drama Series for David Chase. James Gandolfini and Nancy Marchand both submitted this episode for the Primetime Emmy Award for Outstanding Lead Actor in a Drama Series & Primetime Emmy Award for Outstanding Supporting Actress in a Drama Series, respectively. Nancy Marchand additionally submitted the next episode, 46 Long.

Connections to future episodes 
 Christopher mentions his cousin Gregory's girlfriend who claims to be a development girl. Gregory and Amy Safir would both make an appearance in "D-Girl". 
 Pussy correcting the quote to Christopher that "Luca Brasi sleeps with the fishes" would ultimately foreshadow the former's fate. In the Season 2 finale "Funhouse", Pussy's dead body gets thrown in the ocean after Tony, Silvio, and Paulie execute him for being an FBI informant — mirroring the quote.   
 The opening shot of the first scene in Dr. Melfi's waiting room shows Tony triangularly framed by the legs of a sculpture of a naked woman. In the Season 3 episode "Second Opinion", this exact framing is replicated, this time with Tony's wife, Carmela seen through the legs of the statue. 
 Tony talks to Dr. Melfi about Gary Cooper as "the strong, silent type" and how society has become a far cry from that ideal, with people constantly playing the victim and complaining about their problems instead of doing what they have to do as Cooper's characters did. In the episode "Christopher", Tony does exactly the same thing when Silvio's complaints about the Native American boycott of the Columbus Day Parade go too far in Tony's eyes.  
 In episodes, "The Legend of Tennessee Moltisanti" (with Georgie Santorelli's help) and "Cold Cuts" (with Tony Blundetto's help), Christopher disinters and moves Emil Kolar's remains.
 In "Whoever Did This", Tony suspects Ralph Cifaretto of having Pie-O-My's stable torched. He asks if Ralph has heard from Corky Ianucci lately — an expert arsonist who was responsible for setting Artie Bucco's restaurant on fire in the pilot episode.
 Carmela wants to take Meadow to the Plaza Hotel for teaa longtime mother-daughter traditionMeadow declines in this episode; it takes place in the season four episode "Eloise".
 Carmela tells Tony he will go to Hell when he dies. Tony reminds her of this in "Whitecaps". In "Join the Club", Carmela tearfully tells a comatose Tony that she regrets saying this.
 When describing Uncle Junior, Tony tells Dr. Melfi that his uncle embarrassed him by telling all his girl cousins he didn't have the makings of a varsity athlete. Uncle Junior repeats that declaration to Tony on multiple occasions in the season five episode "Where's Johnny?".
 Tony's ownership of John F. Kennedy's sailing hat, which he keeps on his boat The Stugots, is established in this episode. He later shows it off in the season five episode "In Camelot".
 "Little Pussy" Malanga, the man Uncle Junior wants to kill in Artie's restaurant, is the same person for whom Junior mistakes Tony when he shoots him in the season six episode "Members Only".

Music 
 The very first song to play in the background while Tony gets the newspaper is "Welcome (Back)" by Land of the Loops. It is played again in "The Legend of Tennessee Moltisanti".
 The background music playing while Tony is in the pool with the ducks is "Who Can You Trust?" by Morcheeba (from their album of the same name).
 The song played in the kitchen during the breakfast scene, while Tony plays with the ducks, is "Shame Shame Shame" by Shirley & Company.
 The song played in the kitchen during the breakfast scene, as Tony and Carmela speak, is "I'm So Happy I Can't Stop Crying" by Sting.
 The song played in the car, when Christopher first appears, is Fred Neil's "The Other Side of This Life", performed by Jefferson Airplane. The cut is from the album Bless Its Pointed Little Head.
 The song played when Christopher and Tony are chasing Tony's debtor is "I Wonder Why" by Dion and the Belmonts. Within the commentary track on the DVD release, David Chase states his regret about choosing this song for the scene.
 The song played in the scene outside the cafe is "Rumble" by Link Wray and His Ray Men.
 The song played as Tony and Christopher drive to Vesuvio and as they meet Uncle Junior and Artie Bucco is "Can't Be Still" by Booker T. & the M.G.'s.
 The song played on the CD player Tony bought for Livia is "Who's Sorry Now?" by Connie Francis
 The song played during Tony's first attack is "Chi il bel sogno di Doretta" from La rondine, by Giacomo Puccini. This song is also played at the end of the episode "Irregular Around the Margins".
 The song played during the scene where Christopher kills Emil Kolar is "I'm A Man" by Bo Diddley.
 The song played at the Bada Bing when Tony and Christopher meet with Hesh is "Fired Up!" by Funky Green Dogs
 The song played in Meadow's room when she informs Carmela that she is not going to the New York Plaza Hotel is "Lumina" by Joan Osborne.
 The song played on Dick's car radio when he informs Tony and Paulie about the Kolar Bros. withdrawing their bid is "Little Star" by The Elegants.
 The song played when Tony is with Irina, his mistress, in a restaurant and runs into Dr. Melfi who is also on a date is the same one as when he has a date with Carmela at the restaurant, is "Tardes de Bolonha" by Madredeus.
 The song played during the barbecue scene at the end is "No More I Love You's" by Annie Lennox.
The song played during the nursing home scene is the Theme from the Rockford Files by Mike Post and Peter Carpenter. 
 The song played over the end credits is "The Beast in Me" by Nick Lowe.

Filming locations
In order of first appearance:

North Caldwell, New Jersey
Paramus, New Jersey
 Elizabeth, New Jersey
Verona, New Jersey
West Orange, New Jersey
 Satin Dolls in Lodi, New Jersey
 Long Island City, Queens
 The Great Falls in Paterson, New Jersey
 Skyway Golf Course in Jersey City, New Jersey
 Tribeca, Manhattan
St. Patrick's Parish in Jersey City, New Jersey

References

External links 
 "The Sopranos"  at HBO
 

1999 American television episodes
American television series premieres
The Sopranos (season 1) episodes
Television episodes written by David Chase
Television episodes directed by David Chase